I Will Be There may refer to:

 I Will Be There (album), a 2003 album by Kyla, or its title track
 I Will Be There (EP), a 1985 EP by Gogmagog
 "I Will Be There" (Dan Seals song)
 "I Will Be There" (Van Morrison song)
 "I Will Be There", a song by Art of Dying (band) from Art of Dying
 "I Will Be There", a song by Britney Spears from ...Baby One More Time
 "I Will Be There", a song by Katie Melua from Ketevan
 "I Will Be There", a song by Odessa from the soundtrack of the 2014 teen romantic drama film If I Stay

See also
I'll Be There (disambiguation)